The 1990 NCAA Women's Division I Swimming and Diving Championships were contested at the seventh annual NCAA-sanctioned swim meet to determine the team and individual national champions of Division I women's collegiate swimming and diving in the United States. 

This year's events were hosted by the University of Texas at the Texas Swimming Center in Austin, Texas. 

Hosts Texas reclaimed the top spot in the team standings, finishing 9.5 points ahead of defending champions Stanford. It was the Longhorns' sixth women's team title. The University Of Texas team consisted of:
Caron Arnold Farrell,
Katy Arris Wilson, 
Julie Cooper Bliemel,
Andrea Ciro,
Kelley Davies Currin, 
Jeanne Doolan Cunningham,
Dana Dutcher May,
Leigh Ann Fetter-Witt, 
Andrea Hayes Dickson,
Kelly Jenkins Madden,
Erica Jude Cain,
Kristi Kiggans Bertelsman, 
Julie Knesel Powell,
Lydia Morrow Chase,
Tara Nye Huntress, 
Garland O’Keefe Wilson,
Patty Overmyer Armstrong,
Marlene Parchman Cornelius,
Amy Shaw Collins,
Kristina Stinson Straface,
Melissa Strieby Cusack,
Dorsey Tierney Walker,
Jodi Wilson Kuhn,
Head Coach Mark Schubert, 
Assistant Coach Jill Sterkel,
Assistant Coach Cheryl Ridall

Program changes
Platform diving made its debut at the championships, the most recent new event added to the program.

Team standings
Note: Top 10 only
(H) = Hosts
(DC) = Defending champions
Full results

See also
List of college swimming and diving teams

References

NCAA Division I Swimming And Diving Championships
NCAA Division I Swimming And Diving Championships
NCAA Division I Women's Swimming and Diving Championships